Mary Boland (born Marie Anne Boland; January 28, 1882 – June 23, 1965) was an American stage and film actress.

Early years
Born in Philadelphia, Pennsylvania, Boland was the daughter of repertory actor William Augustus Boland, and his wife Mary Cecilia Hatton. She had an older sister named Sara. The family later moved to Detroit.

Boland went to school at the Convent of the Sacred Heart in Detroit. By age fifteen she had left school and was performing on stage.

In 1901, she began acting on stage with a local stock theater company.

Career 
She debuted on Broadway in 1907 in the play The Ranger with Dustin Farnum and had appeared in eleven Broadway productions, notably with John Drew, becoming his "leading lady in New York and on the road." She made her silent film debut for Triangle Studios in 1915. She entertained soldiers in France during World War I and then returned to America. After appearing in nine movies, she left filmmaking in 1920, returning to the stage and appearing in several Broadway productions, including The Torch-Bearers (1922). She became famous as a comedian.

Boland's greatest success on the stage in the 1920s was the comedy The Cradle Snatchers (1925–26), in which she, Edna May Oliver, and Margaret Dale, having been abandoned by their husbands, take on young lovers. Roy Liebman notes this play helped establish the persona that would be associated with her for the rest of her career. Boland's paramour was Humphrey Bogart in one of his first roles. She had previously performed with Bogart in the 1923 comedy Meet the Wife at the Klaw Theatre as Gertrude Lennox.

After an eleven-year absence, in 1931, she returned to Hollywood under contract to Paramount Pictures. She achieved far greater film success with her second try, becoming one of the most popular character actresses of the 1930s, always playing major roles in her films and often starring, notably in a series of comedies opposite Charles Ruggles.

Boland appeared in numerous films, including Ruggles of Red Gap, The Big Broadcast of 1936, Danger - Love at Work, Nothing but Trouble, and Julia Misbehaves. She is likely best remembered for her portrayals of Countess DeLave in The Women (1939) and Mrs. Bennet in Pride and Prejudice (1940).

For the remainder of her career, Boland combined films and, later, television productions, with appearances on stage, including starring in the 1935 Cole Porter musical Jubilee and appearing in the play "One Fine Day" with Charlie Ruggles in 1948. Her last Broadway appearance was in 1954 at the age of seventy-two. That play, Lullaby, was unsuccessful. Her last acting was in the 1955 television adaptation of The Women recreating her film role.

Personal life and death 
Boland never married or had children. On June 23, 1965, she died of a heart attack at her home in New York. She was interred in the Great Mausoleum, Sanctuary of Vespers in Forest Lawn Memorial Park Cemetery in Glendale, California. Boland was a practicing Roman Catholic and a Republican who supported the campaign of Dwight Eisenhower during the 1952 presidential election.

Recognition 
For her contribution to the film industry, Boland has a motion pictures star on the Hollywood Walk of Fame at 6150 Hollywood Boulevard.

Filmography

Silent
The Edge of the Abyss (1915) - Alma Clayton
The Price of Happiness (1916) - Bertha Miller
The Stepping Stone (1916) - Mary Beresford
Mountain Dew (1917) - Lily Bud Raines
A Woman's Experience (1918, Extant; Library of Congress) - Agnes Roydant
The Prodigal Wife (1918) - Marion Farnham
The Perfect Lover (1919) - Mrs. Whitney
His Temporary Wife (1920) - Verna Devore

Sound

Secrets of a Secretary (1931) - Mrs. Merritt
Personal Maid (1931) - Mrs. Otis Gary
The Night of June 13 (1932) - Mazie Strawn
Evenings for Sale (1932) - Jenny Kent
If I Had a Million (1932) - Mrs. Peabody
Mama Loves Papa (1933) - Jessie Todd
Three-Cornered Moon (1933) - Mrs. Nellie Rimplegar
The Solitaire Man (1933) - Mrs. Hopkins
Four Frightened People (1934) - Mrs. Mardick
Six of a Kind (1934) - Flora Whinney
Melody in Spring (1934) - Mary Blodgett
Stingaree (1934) - Mrs. Clarkson
Here Comes the Groom (1934) - Mrs. Widden
Down to Their Last Yacht (1934) - Queen of Malakamokalu, 'Queenie'
The Pursuit of Happiness (1934) - Comfort Kirkland
Ruggles of Red Gap (1935) - Effie Floud
People Will Talk (1935) - Clarice Wilton
Two for Tonight (1935) - Mrs. Smythe
The Big Broadcast of 1936 (1935) - Mrs. Sealingsworth
Early to Bed (1936) - Tessie Weeks
A Son Comes Home (1936) - Mary Grady
Wives Never Know (1936) - Marcia Bigelow
College Holiday (1936) - Carola P. Gaye
Marry the Girl (1937) - Ollie Radway
Danger – Love at Work (1937) - Mrs. Alice Pemberton
There Goes the Groom (1937) - Mrs. Russell
Mama Runs Wild (1937) - Alice Summers
Little Tough Guys in Society (1938) - Mrs. Berry
Artists and Models Abroad (1938) - Mrs. Isabel Channing
Boy Trouble (1939) - Sybil Fitch
The Magnificent Fraud (1939) - Mme. Geraldine Genet
Night Work (1939) - Sybil Fitch
The Women (1939) - The Countess De Lave - Flora
He Married His Wife (1940) - Ethel
New Moon (1940) - Valerie de Rossac
Pride and Prejudice (1940) - Mrs. Bennet
Hit Parade of 1941 (1940) - Emily Potter
One Night in the Tropics (1940) - Aunt Kitty Marblehead
In Our Time (1944) - Mrs. Bromley
Nothing but Trouble (1944) - Mrs. Hawkley
Forever Yours (1945) - Aunt Mary
Julia Misbehaves (1948) - Ma Ghenoccio
Guilty Bystander (1950) - Smitty

References

External links

allmovie/bio

New York Public Library collection of Mary Boland photographs.
Boland and costars from The Women
Mary on the cover of The Theater magazine in the 1910 play Smith costarring John Drew
Mary Boland along with several other actors on Orson Welles's Radio Almanac 1944
young beautiful Mary Boland
1918 passport photo
portrait gallery(University of Washington, Sayre)
brief article on Mary Boland as a Laurel & Hardy player
 Mary Boland: Broadway Photographs(Univ. of South Carolina)
Mary on the cover of The Theatre Jan. 1913(archived)

1882 births
1965 deaths
American film actresses
American silent film actresses
American stage actresses
Actresses from Philadelphia
20th-century American actresses
Burials at Forest Lawn Memorial Park (Glendale)
Paramount Pictures contract players
American television actresses
American Roman Catholics
Pennsylvania Republicans
California Republicans
New York (state) Republicans
Actresses from Pennsylvania